Shem is a masculine given name that may refer to the following notable people:
Shem Tov, multiple people
Shem Bageine, Ugandan politician
Shem Delaney, Irish hurler
Shem Downey (1922–2013), Irish hurler
Shem Drowne (1683–1774), American coppersmith and tinplate worker
Shem Kororia (born 1972), Kenyan long-distance runner
Shem Marton (born 1995), Indian football midfielder
Shem Ngoche (born 1989), Kenyan cricketer
Shem Ochuodho, Kenyan politician
Shem Tatupu (born 1968), Samoan rugby league and rugby union footballer